The 1950 All-Ireland Minor Hurling Championship was the 20th staging of the All-Ireland Minor Hurling Championship since its establishment by the Gaelic Athletic Association in 1928.

Tipperary entered the championship as the defending champions.

On 3 September 1950 Kilkenny won the championship following a 3-4 to 1-5 defeat of Tipperary in the All-Ireland final. This was their fourth All-Ireland title and their first in 14 championship seasons.

Results

All-Ireland Minor Hurling Championship

Semi-finals

Final

Championship statistics

Miscellaneous

 Kilkenny defeat Tipperary in the championship for the first time since 1935.

References

Minor
All-Ireland Minor Hurling Championship